Poole Park is an urban park adjacent to Poole Harbour in Poole, Dorset, England. The park was opened during the Victorian era and has remained popular with visitors ever since. It is open all year round and hosts a number of events.

History
The park was constructed on land donated by Lord Wimborne and was opened by the Prince of Wales in 1890. Poole Park Zoo was operated from June 1963 until it fell out of favour in February 1994. Although small, at one time it boasted a Himalayan black bear. The park was designated a Conservation Area in 1995, and in 2007 a £2 million project was undertaken to dredge the lake and create five small islands and two raised reed beds. The project also involved the construction of a new restaurant and an indoor ice rink for children.

On 7 January 2015 it was announced that Poole Park would receive £260,000 of Heritage Lottery Fund (HLF). The money will go towards a multimillion-pound redevelopment. 
The first round of funding for Poole Park follows a fundraising campaign by the Friends of Poole Park.
The cash will be spent over the next two years while a detailed research and monitoring project on the boating lake is carried out.
The development phase of the project is expected to be completed in late 2016, with the second phase of the bid submitted shortly after.

Attractions

Facilities include two children's play areas, tennis courts, a bowling green, miniature golf and Poole Park Railway (a ridable miniature railway). A cricket field and pavilion inside the park are home to Poole Town Cricket Club and water sport activities such as sailing, windsurfing, kayaking, rowing and model yacht racing with Poole Radio Yacht Club take place on the lake. The boating lake is around 21 hectares in size and between 1 and 1.5 meters deep. The lake can only be emptyed or filled during spring tides via sluices to the harbour, it is also filled via the local surface water drainage system meaning that the water is brackish (a mixture of salt and freshwater).

Every Saturday morning Parkrun—a free timed 5 km running event—is held at 9:00 am, starting near the water fountain. The run uses flat tarmac paths and flat hard compact gravel within the park. Poole Parkrun regularly hosts over 500 runners each week.
On Christmas Day 2019 Poole parkrun set a new attendance record of 1345 runners.

References

External links

Friends of Poole Park
Poole Parkrun

Tourist attractions in Poole
Parks and open spaces in Dorset
Poole Harbour
1890 establishments in England